Sienra can refer to:

 A beach town in Asturias, Spain: San Pelayo de Sienra
 A large family that originated in Spain that emigrated to other areas of the world, especially Uruguay.
Some notable members of this family include:

Gisel Silva Sienra, semi-finalist in Miss World 1988 representing Uruguay
José Luis Zorrilla de San Martín, Uruguayan sculptor
Luis Casaravilla Sienra, well-known tango musician, friend of Carlos Gardel
Myriam Sienra (1939–2020), Paraguayan actress
Rodolfo Sienra, President of the Club Nacional de Futbol soccer team, 1983-1985.
Vera Sienra, Uruguayan singer